Gragnano, a hill town located between a mountain crest and the Amalfi Coast, is a comune (municipality) in the Metropolitan City of Naples in southern Italy's Campania region, located about  southeast of Naples city.

Gragnano borders the following municipalities: Agerola, Casola di Napoli, Castellammare di Stabia, Lettere, Pimonte, Ravello, Sant'Antonio Abate, Santa Maria la Carità, Scala.

In 1169 its name was added to the title of the bishopric of nearby Lettere, which was thus renamed Roman Catholic Diocese of Lettere-Gragnano, but Gragnano never had a co-cathedral and its title was dropped when the suppressed see was nominally restored as titular bishopric of Lettere.

Pasta 

Gragnano is home of some of the best dried pasta in Italy. In 2013, Gragnano pasta was designated a Protected Geographical Indication by the European Union.

Gragnano's "main street was laid out expressly to capture the mountain breeze mixed with sea air back when pasta makers hung spaghetti on drying rods like laundry," according to a Forbes Life write up. More recently heaters are used to dry the pasta at low temperatures (approximately ) for two days and it is shaped with bronze to give it a rough texture, producing a pasta with "nuttier aroma and chewier mouth feel."

Notable locals 
The actor Tito Vuolo was born there.

References

Sources and external links 

Official website

Cities and towns in Campania